This is a list of the National Register of Historic Places listings in Tooele County, Utah.

This is intended to be a complete list of the properties and districts on the National Register of Historic Places in Tooele County, Utah, United States.  Latitude and longitude coordinates are provided for many National Register properties and districts; these locations may be seen together in a map.

There are 29 properties listed on the National Register in the county, including 1 National Historic Landmark.



Current listings

|}

See also
 List of National Historic Landmarks in Utah
 National Register of Historic Places listings in Utah

References

External links

Tooele